Song Renqiong (11 July 1909 – 8 January 2005), born Song Yunqin, was a general in the People's Liberation Army of the People's Republic of China (PRC) and one of the Eight Elders of the Chinese Communist Party.

Biography
Song Renqiong was born in Liuyang, Hunan Province in 1909.

During the Second Sino-Japanese War, he was the vice director of the political department of the 129th Division. Toward the end of the Chinese Civil War, he was the vice political commissar of the Northeastern Field Army.

After the establishment of the PRC in 1949, he was the secretary of the Chinese Communist Party (CCP)'s committee in Yunnan Province, Vice Secretary of the Southwestern Bureau of the CCP, Vice Secretary-general of the CCP Central Committee, minister of No. 2, No. 3 and No. 7 Mechanical Industry Department, and No. 1 Secretary of the Northeastern Bureau of CCP. He was the Vice Chairman of the 4th and 5th National Political Consultative Conference. He was an alternative member of the Politburo of the 8th CCP Central Committee, a Secretary of the Central Secretariat of the 11th CCP Central Committee, and a Politburo member of the 12th. Like many others, he was purged during the Cultural Revolution and rehabilitated after Mao's death. He was the vice-chairman of the PRC's Central Advisory Committee and served under Deng Xiaoping. Although the commission was in theory a council of retired elders with no official power, members effectively held veto power over major policies and personnel affairs.  During the Tiananmen Square protests of 1989, Song was one of the most ardent supporters of Deng, who decided to use violence to crush the student movement. He was one of the influential Chinese leaders during the 80s and is considered to be one of the Eight Elders of the Chinese Communist Party.

Death
He died aged 95, on 8 January 2005 in Beijing, following an illness. Though Song Renqiong had died before Zhao Ziyang, he had requested that his floral wreath and elegiac couplet appear in Zhao's funeral. His funeral was held on 15 January. The highest Chinese officials, including Hu Jintao and Jiang Zemin, attended his funeral. The Chinese media reported Song as "an outstanding member of the Communist Party, a great Communist soldier, a remarkable proletarian revolutionary and a prominent leader of the party's political work."

See also
 List of officers of the People's Liberation Army

References

1909 births
2005 deaths
Politicians from Changsha
Chinese Communist Party politicians from Hunan
People's Republic of China politicians from Hunan
Political office-holders in Yunnan
Members of the Secretariat of the Chinese Communist Party
Chinese military personnel of World War II
Members of the 12th Politburo of the Chinese Communist Party
Vice Chairpersons of the National Committee of the Chinese People's Political Consultative Conference
Burials at Babaoshan Revolutionary Cemetery